Pauran (English: Citizen) is a 2005 Malayalam political thriller film directed by sundardas featuring Jayaram, Kalabhavan Mani and Geethu Mohandas in the lead roles. The movie was produced by Sunil Baby under the banner of Dolphin Creations and was distributed by Dolphin Creations and Sreemovies. The film was a box-office disaster.

Plot 
Divakaran (Jayaram), son of martyr Karunakaran, is well accepted in his village. He takes part in an election and becomes an MLA under the panel of the Communist party. MLA Divakaran was sorrowful about some of his party tactics. He expressed his disdain and firmly opposed a move to stage strikes involving students. He started objecting against the party misdeeds which provoked the party leaders and soon he became an outcast. However, in the end he is brutally killed by his political enemies who burn him alive.

Cast 
 Jayaram as Divakaran
 Kalabhavan Mani as Komalan
 Sai Kumar as Gopalji
 Riyaz Khan as Thomachan
 Vijayaraghavan as Bhargavan
 Babu Namboothiri as Chacko
 Jishnu  as Student Leader
 Venu Nagavalli as chief minister
 Augustineas Koshi
 T. P. Madhavan as Narayanan
 Kollam Thulasi as minister
 Abu Salim
 Geethu Mohandas as Aani
 KPAC Lalitha as Janaki
 Urmila Unni
 Suja Karthika
 Sukumari as Minister
 Ponnamma Babu as Dr. Ponnamma

Songs 
The songs of the movie were composed by Raghukumar, with lyrics by Gireesh Puthenchery. The background music was done by Rajamani.

 "Mauna Nombara": M. G. Sreekumar, Ranjini Jose
 "Oru Nullu Bhasmamay": P. Jayachandran
 "Thamarappoove": K. S. Chithra
 "Lal Salam": Afsal, Devanand, Vidya Suresh

References

External links 
 

2005 films
2000s Malayalam-language films
Films directed by Sundar Das
Films scored by Raghu Kumar